The Women's Independent Living Group (WILG) is one of five independent living groups at the Massachusetts Institute of Technology. It is situated along Massachusetts Avenue in Central Square, Cambridge and consists of five floors of residential areas, kitchens, and student lounges. It houses about 45 female students.

Structure
 The house consists of 2 entryways leading to five floors of single and double bedrooms for approximately 45 students. The house also hosts a main dining room, four lounges on various floors, a music room, an exercise room, a library, a Graduate Resident Assistant (GRA) suite, two kitchens, a computer room, a guest room, and other common spaces.

The basement houses laundry machines, storage space, and machinery for renovations. Additionally, the back entryway leads to a parking space and areas for bike racks. The building itself is connected structurally to the MIT Alpha Delta Phi (ADP) fraternity, which shares a balcony with the house. The house is run by an executive government, with advisory from the WILG Alumnae Corporation.

History
The Women's Independent Living Group (WILG) was founded in 1976 by Kate Hendricks '71, Dorothy L. Bowe '84, Marjorie Pierce, Elisabeth Drake ’58, former Assistant Dean for Student Affairs Nancy Wheatley ’71, Zaurie Zimmerman ’77, and former Dean Ken Wadleigh.

the 1960s, several sororities at MIT approached coed living groups about starting a chapter on campus. A small group of students approached the Association of MIT Alumnae (AMITA) about the possibility of an all-women's living group. At the time, while there were places for women to live on and off campus, including McCormick, a female-only dorm, and several co-ed fraternities and dorms, there was no cooperative living group for females.

The population of female students on campus was also beginning to overcrowd McCormick, so the Dean of the Graduate School Ken Wadleigh proposed using a building at 351-355 Massachusetts Avenue as the location for the new living group. The building was MIT controlled, although owned independently by Northgate Corporation and being used as an apartment providing off-campus housing to MIT affiliates. Because the building was deemed too large for one living group, half was allotted to Alpha Delta Phi (ADP), then a new fraternity forming on campus.

While 355 Massachusetts Avenue was being renovated, both the women's living group and the fraternity shared the living space in 351. The first floor was built with a ramp instead of stairs for the back door to ensure at least one handicapped-accessible floor. In 1976, the independent living group had its first entry in the Undergraduate Residence Book, distributed to incoming freshmen to help them choose their living arrangement for the year. In the 1976-1977 school year, ten women and six freshman joined the house, alongside four transfer students.

Several of the founders, Dorothy Lowe, Elisabeth Drake, Marjorie Pierce, and Kate Hendricks, formed the WILG Alumnae Corporation as its first members in order to advise the house.

People

Notable alumni of WILG include:
 Megan Smith '86 MEng '88, Chief Technology Officer of the United States
 Donna Baranski-Walker '81, Founder of The Rebuilding Alliance
 Marjorie Pierce '22, Architect
 Heidemarie Stefanyshyn-Piper '84, Astronaut
Farah Alibay '13, NASA Systems Engineer
 Alexandra Piotrowski-Daspit '11, Postdoctoral Fellow at Yale University
 Karen Gleason '82, Assistant Provost at the Massachusetts Institute of Technology

WILG symbols

The WILG logo was redesigned in 2009 by Clare Bayley '11, consisting of a large ornamental "W" used as an identifier. The font choice was inspired by serif font faces, with purple curlicues wrapped around the outer edge of the dark bronze letter.

See also
Housing at the Massachusetts Institute of Technology

External links
 MIT Independent Living Groups (ILGs)
 WILG official site

References

Massachusetts Institute of Technology student life